Desmond John Frawley (23 September 1924 – 23 May 1996) was a company owner and member of the Queensland Legislative Assembly.

Early days
Frawley was born in Brisbane, Queensland, to parents Stanley John Frawley and his wife Alice Mary (née Campbell). He attended Virginia State School, St Columban's College, and Brisbane Grammar School. Soon after leaving school he joined the RAAF where he served from 1942 to 1946. On his discharge he trained as an electrical mechanic under the Commonwealth Rehabilitation Scheme with the Public Works Department, Brisbane, for a period of three years. He then worked as a lift mechanic for 20 years with the Otis Elevator Company in Brisbane. Finally, he went into business and owned Frawley Motors for 20 years.

Political career
Frawley, representing the Country Party (1972–74) (which became the National Party in 1974), won the seat of Murrumba in 1972. He held the seat until 1977 and then moved to the neighbouring seat of Caboolture which he held from 1977 to 1983.

He had previously been an alderman in the Redcliffe City Council from 1967 until 1972.

Personal life
In 1944, Frawley married Laurell Irene Orford and together had three sons.

He was a life member of the Queensland Amateur Athletics Association, and member of the Redcliffe Trotting Club. He was patron of the Queensland Veterans Athletics Association and was  Queensland decathlon champion 1949–52 and Queensland pentathlon champion 1951–52. In 1937, while a student at Virginia State School he won the coveted Norman Grehan Trophy for athletics.

He died in 1996 and was buried in Redcliffe Cemetery.

References

Members of the Queensland Legislative Assembly
1924 births
1996 deaths
National Party of Australia members of the Parliament of Queensland
20th-century Australian politicians